This article is about the composition of the Regional Council of Calabria, the legislative assembly of Calabria, during the VIII Legislature, which is to say the term started in April 2005, following the 2005 regional election, and concluded in April 2010.

References

Politics of Calabria